Power Hockey also known as Powerchair Hockey is a competitive, fast-paced hockey game based on the use of a power wheelchair. The foundation of the sport derives from ice hockey and floor hockey, but with adapted rules to enable people with disabilities, who use a power wheelchair, to play and be active in a competitive team setting. The sport is also referred to as Electric Wheelchair Hockey or Electric Wheelchair Floorball in various parts of the world.

History of power hockey
In the 1970s, some public schools began providing sports lessons for pupils with disabilities. The majority of the children had physical disabilities that greatly hindered their movement (muscular dystrophy, cerebral palsy) and were not capable of participating in mainstream sports. This type of sport was great for adaptation because it could be played by solely utilizing the maneuverability of the wheelchair, and not focus on gross motor movement and muscle power.

There are similarities with floorball. Power Hockey is also referred to as "Electric Wheelchair Hockey", and the name has some history behind it. With its great similarity to ice hockey, it was initially just called "Wheelchair Hockey", but later in order indicate the use of an electric wheelchair, the word "electric" was added.

Power Hockey (Electric Wheelchair Hockey) began to receive public interest in the late 1980s, when tournaments were established in Germany and Netherlands. However, it wasn't until the 1990s that power hockey began to receive international attention. In 1998, the first ever World Games for Power Hockey were held in Utrecht, Netherlands. In 2001, a big international Power Hockey tournament took place in Minneapolis. In the following years, World Championships, European Championships, and more tournaments were formed in other European countries such as Belgium, Finland, and Italy.

Positions
The number of players on a specific team can change, but at any given time there are five players on the floor. There is usually one head coach and one assistant coach to direct the movements of the team members.
 One center
 One goaltender
 Two winger positions (left and right)
 One defenceman position

Rule changes
 A basketball court is used instead of ice.
 A plastic ball is used instead of a hockey puck.
 The hockey stick that is used is made entirely from plastic.
 Players with excessive limited range and movement can play with a T-stick. 
 Due to the goalies' limited ability to move, they do not freeze the ball. Instead, the official blows the whistle to stop play when the ball is underneath the goaltender's wheelchair, and play restarts with a keeperball.
 "Each playoff game will consist of three fifteen minute non-stop time periods. The last two minutes of the third period will be played on a stop-time basis" ("CEWHA Official Tournament Rules and Regulations"). If the score is tied at the end of the game, teams will play for additional five minutes, and whichever team that scores first will win ("CEWHA Official Tournament Rules and Regulations").

Equipment 
 "All players must use a power wheelchair. Manual wheelchairs and electric scooters are not permitted" ("CEWHA Official Tournament Rules and Regulations").
 All players are required to wear their team sweaters that are distinct from the other teams' at all times ("CEWHA Official Tournament Rules and Regulations").
 All players need to be fully equipped with a protective eyewear and a seat belt ("CEWHA Official Tournament Rules and Regulations").

World rankings 
Below is the world rankings for power hockey provided by International Wheelchair & Amputee Sports Federation. 
It has been updated after the EC2016 that was held in De Rijp, Netherlands, and published on the IPCH website on 31 August 2016.
Netherlands
Italy
Germany
Belgium
Denmark
Switzerland
Finland
Australia
Slovenia
Spain
Czech Republic

Variations 
There are many variations of hockey besides power hockey. These variations of hockey differ in rules, settings, and materials (Mittal 19–20).
 Ball hockey
 Box hockey
 Broomball
 Deck hockey
 Floor hockey
 Floorball
 Foot hockey
 Gym hockey
 Indoor field hockey
 Mini hockey
 Nok hockey
 Pond hockey
 Rossall hockey
 Shinny
 Skater hockey
 Spongee
 Table hockey
 Underwater hockey
 Unicycle hockey

Sponsorships/partnerships 
There are many different corporate partners and corporate sponsors for the Power Hockey League. Opportunities are available for companies and businesses to sponsor the league and support disabled people as they enjoy a sport dear to their heart. Companies have taken these opportunities since the league was first created to have their brand associated with the league. There are currently over a dozen sponsors.

See also
Wheelchair Sports, USA
Sledge hockey

External links
IPCH - IWAS PowerChair Hockey - 
U.S Electric Wheelchair Hockey Association
Toronto Power Wheelchair Hockey League
Canadian Electric Wheelchair Hockey Association
Wheelchair Hockey League (WCHL - Michigan)
Disabled Sports USA
North Carolina Electric Wheelchair Hockey Association
National Sports Center for the Disabled
FIWH 
Gruppo Sportivo ViterSport 
M-Team Electric Gladiators (Finnish power hockey club)
Manitoba Power Wheelchair Hockey Association
CEWHA Official Tournament Rules and Regulations
IWAS Committee Electric Wheelchair Hockey - History
PowerHockey.com - Leagues
HOCKEY : RULES AND REGULATIONS
World Rankings

References 

Variations of ice hockey
Variations of hockey
Hockey
Team sports